Alexey Molchanov (born 6 March 1987 in Volgograd) is a Russian champion freediver, 24-time world champion (AIDA and CMAS), world record holder, and freediving promoter. He is also president of the "Freediving Federation" association, president of AIDA Russia, head of freediving school named in honor of Natalia Molchanova, and designer and engineer of the freediving equipment brand Molchanovs. Alexey is a son of Natalia Molchanova – multiple champion and world record holder in freediving.

Career

He achieved his first world record in 2008 in a pool discipline called Dynamic Apnea, in which he swam 250m underwater with a monofin on one breath. Since then he focused on the depth disciplines and began to compete in the open water.

In 2012, he set a world record in Sharm el-Sheikh, Egypt, when he dived to 125m using a monofin. Later that year, Alexey broke his own world record with a dive to 126m in Dean's Blue Hole in the Bahamas. Alexey broke this record again at the 2013 AIDA World Championships in Kalamata, Greece, where he dived on one breath to 128m and returned to surface under difficult conditions. He extended that record to 129m in Baja in 2016. In 2018, Alexey dived 130m in the Bahamas and set a new world record.

Overall, he has set 25 world records (13 records according to AIDA rules, 12 records according to CMAS rules, and 1 Guinness record) and earned 32 combined gold, silver, and bronze individual and team medals at world championship events.

A former nationally ranked swimmer, Alexey took up freediving as a teenager when his mother, the late Natalia Molchanova, fell in love with the sport. She would go on to develop a branded training program, which included meditative techniques. Alexey has followed her footsteps and in addition to running the Russian Freediving Federation, he is developing Molchanovs brand, which produces free-diving gear.

An entrepreneur athlete, Alexey Molchanov splits his time between his homes in Moscow and Dahab, runs regular training camps in Turkey, Mexico, on Lake Baikal and even in the Kingdom of Tonga, and competes all over the world. Alexey is actively involved in environmental issues and water purification all over the world. He often brings his camera and drone along with him and one may find his underwater photos in online galleries and exhibitions.

In 2020, he pushed the bifins depth still further and earned a Guinness World Record for longest recorded dive – nearly 600 feet under ice (181 m).

In March 2021, Alexey dived 80 meters, or approximately 262 feet, beneath the one-meter-thick icy surface and back up on a single breath. In the process, he broke another world record: the deepest free dive under the ice with fins. He also became an ambassador of the Lake Baikal Foundation.

In July 2021, Alexey Molchanov was a competitor of the nine-day international competition Vertical Blue at Dean's Blue Hole in the Bahamas. He made three world record dives in different disciplines. He also set two records in CMAS: 87 and 90 metres in the CNF discipline.

Personal life 
Molchanov has been married to Elena Sokolova since 2016. Elena is a Russian swimmer, a winner of the World Universiade (2013), a participant of the 2008 and 2012 Olympic Games, and an international-class Master of Sports of Russia.

Records and medals

Summary:
 STA – 8 min. 33 sec.
 DYN – 258 m
 DNF – 195 m
 CWT – 131 m
CWTB — 118 m
 CNF – 96 m
 FIM – 126 m

Clarification:
 STA = Static Apnea. Holding the breath as long as possible.
 DYN = Dynamic Apnea with fins. Diving as far as possible with the use of fins or a monofin.
 DNF = Dynamic Apnea without fins. Diving as far as possible without fins.
 CWT = Constant weight with fins. Diving as deep as possible with the use of fins or a monofin.
 CNF = Constant weight without fins. Diving as deep as possible without fins.
 FIM = Free Immersion. Diving as deep as possible by pulling down and up the rope.

Personal bests

Filmography 

 Один вдох (2020)
 Religions of Sports (2018)

References

External links
Breathtaking undersea world of a 'Moscow Merman', By Sheena McKenzie, CNN
 Russian: personal page Russian Freediving Association (checked 11/19/2010)

1987 births
Living people
Russian freedivers
Sportspeople from Volgograd